The Greenpoint Line was a streetcar line in Brooklyn, New York City, United States. When it stopped operating in 1942, it was not replaced by a bus route.

History
The line was opened by the Brooklyn City Railroad in October 1854 to Bushwick Creek. The line ceased operations on August 17, 1942. Parallel service was provided by the Crosstown Line, now the  bus route.

References

Streetcar lines in Brooklyn